The term "maneless lion" or "scanty mane lion" often refers to a male lion without a mane, or with a weak one. The purpose of the mane is thought to protect the lion in territorial fights. Although lions are known for their mane, not all males have one.

Modern lions

In Eurasia 

The Asiatic lion is often considered to have a weak mane compared to its cousins in Africa, due to the hot climate in Asia, but this does not always apply. The manes of most lions in ancient Greece and Asia Minor were also less developed and did not extend to below the belly, sides or ulnas. Lions that occurred in Mesopotamia had hair on the underbelly, unlike modern lions in the wilderness of India, and also, a relief from Nineveh in the Mesopotamian Plain shows a lion with underbelly hair. Lions with such smaller manes were also known in the Syrian region, Arabian peninsula and Egypt, while in Gir Forest of India, cases of maneless lions are rarely reported.

In Iran there are often pictures of stone reliefs with Asiatic lions a without mane. 

Lions with such smaller manes were also known in the Syrian region and Arabian peninsula.

In Africa 
In sub-Saharan Africa, lions with weak manes were reported in Murchison Falls National Park, Uganda.

Tsavo is a region of Kenya located at the crossing of the Uganda Railway over the Tsavo River, close to where it meets the Athi-Galana-Sabaki River. Tsavo male lions generally do not have a mane, though colouration and thickness vary. There are several hypotheses as to the reasons. One is that mane development is closely tied to climate because its presence significantly reduces heat loss. An alternative explanation is that manelessness is an adaptation to the thorny vegetation of the Tsavo area in which a mane might hinder hunting. Tsavo males may have heightened levels of testosterone, which could also explain their reputation for aggression.

West African lions are often seen with weak manes or none.

Lions in Ancient Egyptian art are usually depicted without a mane, but with a ruff around the neck. The reason for this is not known.

Prehistoric lions 

Cave paintings from the Pleistocene epoch often depict lions without manes, even if with the scrotum.

See also 
White lion
Panthera leo leo
Panthera leo melanochaita
History of lions in Europe

References 

Lions